The 2021 World Rowing U23 Championships is the 17th edition of the World Rowing U23 Championships and was held from 7 July to 11 July 2021 in Račice, Czech Republic.

Men's events

Women's events

Medal table

Participants 
A total of 781 rowers from the national teams of the following 54 countries was registered to compete at 2021 World Rowing U23 Championships.

 (21)
 (1)
 (10)
 (10)
 (2)
 (19)
 (12)
 (1)
 (8)
 (1)
 (45)
 (18)
 (1)
 (19)
 (10)
 (1)
 (43)
 (24)
 (72)
 (14)
 (17)
 (15)
 (1)
 (57)
 (2)
 (1)
 (1)
 (11)
 (1)
 (6)
 (3)
 (48)
 (8)
 (1)
 (1)
 (3)
 (31)
 (3)
 (49)
 (3)
 (20)
 (2)
 (4)
 (14)
 (20)
 (7)
 (2)
 (2)
 (10)
 (28)
 (68)
 (3)
 (6)
 (1)

See also 
 2021 World Rowing Championships
 2021 World Rowing Junior Championships

References

External links 
 WorldRowing website

World Rowing U23 Championships
2021
2021 in Czech sport
International sports competitions hosted by the Czech Republic
2021 in rowing
World Rowing